"Ravishing Ruby" is a song written and recorded by American country music artist Tom T. Hall. It was recorded in February 6, 1973 and released in April 1973 as the first single from his album Rhymer and Other Five and Dimers. The song peaked at number 3 on the Billboard Hot Country Singles chart. It also reached number 1 on the RPM Country Tracks chart in Canada.

Chart performance

References

External links 
 

1973 singles
Tom T. Hall songs
Songs written by Tom T. Hall
Song recordings produced by Jerry Kennedy
1973 songs
Mercury Records singles